Sheena may refer to:

People
Ringo Sheena (born 1978), Japanese singer
Shenna Bellows (born 1975), American politician
Sheena Belarmino (born 2005), Filipino singer and dancer
Sheena Easton (born 1959), Scottish actress and singer
Sheena Halili (born 1987), Filipino actress
Sheena Lawrick (born 1983), Canadian softball infielder
Sheena Liam (born 1991), Malaysian model
Sheena McDonald (born 1954), Scottish journalist and broadcaster
Sheena Sakai, contestant on America's Next Top Model
Sheena Shahabadi (born 1986), Indian actress

Characters
Sheena, Queen of the Jungle, an American comic book character that first appeared in 1938
Sheena, Queen of the Jungle, a 1950s television series based on the comics character
Sheena (film), the 1984 film adaptation of the comics character
Sheena (TV series), a 2000-2002 TV series based on the above character
Sheena Fujibayashi, a character in the role-playing game Tales of Symphonia
Strider Sheena, a character from the Strider franchise

See also
 
 Sheen (disambiguation)
 Shenna, a surname and given

Scottish feminine given names
English feminine given names